Yevgeni Popov (born 18 September 1984 in Penza) is a Russian former professional road cyclist.

Major results
2003
 1st Stage 4 Five Rings of Moscow
2005
 1st Stage 1a Five Rings of Moscow
 1st Stage 3 Triptyque des Barrages
 2nd Road race, National Under-23 Road Championships
 3rd Road race, UCI Under-23 Road World Championships
2006
 1st Omloop der Kempen
 2nd Ronde van Noord-Holland
 6th Sparkassen Münsterland Giro
 8th Paris–Tours Espoirs
2008
 6th Omloop der Kempen
 6th Vlaamse Havenpijl
2009
 3rd Duo Normand (with Alexander Porsev)

References

External links

1984 births
Living people
Russian male cyclists
21st-century Russian people